Ronald Grant was the president and chief operating officer of AOL LLC. Grant worked with AOL and its parent company Time Warner since 1997. He came on as president and COO of AOL in 2006.

Early life
Grant earned a bachelor of arts degree in economics from Dartmouth College and an MBA in finance and international business from Columbia Business School.

References

External links
 AOL executive bio

American business executives
Columbia Business School alumni
Dartmouth College alumni
Living people
AOL people
American chief operating officers
Year of birth missing (living people)